The Sahara Cup was a bilateral ODI cricket series between Pakistan and India, which was held annually in Canada. It was staged from 1996 to 1998 at the Toronto Cricket, Skating and Curling Club Ground. The series consisted of 5 ODIs, and all the matches were played in daylight.
Pakistan won the first series 3–2 in 1996. India won 4–1 in 1997. Pakistan again won 4–1 in 1998. A total of 15 matches were played over a span of 3 years. Pakistan have been more successful amongst the two, with a total of 8 victories. India have 7 victories.

The series was a five-year agreement by both the PCB and the BCCI, with the International Management Group (IMG). Trans World International (TWI) and ESPN had telecast rights. The series had gained good popularity in the cricketing arena, just like the Sharjah cup - where two arch-rivals met at a neutral venue. However, the series was later called off after Sahara India - the sponsors - pulled out in the wake of the Pakistani intrusion in Kashmir in 1999. The diplomatic relations between the two countries considerably worsened during the Kargil war in 1999, and further, India suspended all cricketing ties with Pakistan from 2000 until 2004.

Following, is the summary of the match results.

Season 1 (1996)

 Match 1 – Sep 16,1996 – India, 8 wickets
 Match 2 – Sep 17,1996 – Pakistan, 2 wickets
 Match 3 – Sep 18,1996 – India, 55 runs
 Match 4 – Sep 21,1996 – Pakistan, 97 runs
 Match 5 – Sep 23,1996 – Pakistan, 52 runs

Season 2 (1997)

 Match 1 – Sep 13,1997 – India, 20 runs
 Match 2 – Sep 14,1997 – India, 7 wickets
 Match 3 – Sep 17,1997 – no result (Washed out due to rain)
 Match 3 – Sep 18,1997 – India, 34 runs
 Match 4 – Sep 20,1997 – India, 7 wickets
 Match 5 – Sep 21,1997 – Pakistan, 5 wickets

Season 3 (1998)

 Match 1 – 12 Sep, 1998 - Ind, 6 wickets 
 Match 2 – 13 Sep, 1998 - Pak, 51 runs   
 Match 3 – 16 Sep, 1998 - Pak, 77 runs   
 Match 4 – 19 Sep, 1998 - Pak, 134 runs  
 Match 5 – 20 Sep, 1998 - Pak, 5 Wickets

References

International cricket competitions in Canada
Pakistan in international cricket
India in international cricket